Kamehameha I established the Hawaiian Kingdom in 1795 after conquering most of the Hawaiian Islands. In 1810, Kaumualiʻi became a vassal of Kamehameha I, who therefore emerged as the sole sovereign of the island chain of Hawaiʻi. His dynasty lasted until 1872, and his Kingdom lasted until 1893, when Queen Liliʻuokalani, of the Kalākaua dynasty, was deposed by the pro-United States led overthrow of the Hawaiian Kingdom. The monarchy was officially ended on January 24, 1895, when Liliʻuokalani formally abdicated in response to an attempt to restore the royal government. On November 23, 1993, the Congress passed Public Law 103-150, also known as the Apology Resolution, acknowledging the American role in the overthrow of the Hawaiian monarchy. President Bill Clinton signed the joint resolution the same day.

Hawaiian Monarchs (1795–1893) 

|width=auto| Kamehameha ISpring, 1795 – May 8, 1819
| 
| c. 1758Moʻokini Heiau, Kohala, Hawaiʻi islandson of Keōua and Kekuʻiapoiwa
| various
| May 8, 1819Kamakahonu, Kailua-Kona, Kona, Hawaiʻi islandaged 61?
|-
|width=auto| Kamehameha IIMay 20, 1819 – July 14, 1824
| 
| November 1797Hilo, Hawaiʻi islandson of Kamehameha I and Keōpūolani
| (1) Kamāmalu(2) Kīnaʻu(3) Kekāuluohi(4) Kalanipauahi(5) Kekauʻōnohi(6) Kekaihaʻakūlou
| July 14, 1824Caledonian Hotel, London, Englandaged 27
|-
|width=auto| Kamehameha IIIJune 6, 1825 – December 15, 1854
| 
| August 11, 1813Keauhou Bay, North Kona, Hawaiʻi islandson of Kamehameha I and Keōpūolani
| KalamaHonolulu, Oʻahu14 February 1837two sons
| December 15, 1854Honolulu, Oʻahuaged 41
|-
|width=auto| Kamehameha IVJanuary 11, 1855 – November 30, 1863
| 
| February 9, 1834Honolulu, Oʻahubiological son of Kekūanāoʻa and Kīnaʻu and hānai son of Kamehameha III and Kalama
| Emma RookeKawaiahaʻo Church, Honolulu, Oʻahu19 June 1856one son
| November 30, 1863Honolulu, Oʻahuaged 29
|-
|width=auto| Kamehameha VNovember 30, 1863 – December 11, 1872
| 
| December 11, 1830Honolulu, Oʻahubiological son of Kekūanāoʻa and Kīnaʻu and hānai son of Nāhiʻenaʻena (later) Hoapili and Kaheiheimālie
| Never married
| December 11, 1872ʻIolani Palace, Honolulu, Oʻahuaged 42
|-
|width=auto| LunaliloJanuary 8, 1873 – February 3, 1874
| 
| January 31, 1835Pohukaina, Honolulu, Oʻahuson of Kanaʻina and Kekāuluohi
| Never married
| February 3, 1874Haimoeipo, Honolulu, Oʻahuaged 39
|-
|width=auto| KalākauaFebruary 12, 1874 – January 20, 1891
| 
| November 16, 1836Honolulu, Oʻahubiological son of Kapaʻakea and Keohokālole and hānai son of Kinimaka and Haʻaheo Kaniu
| KapiʻolaniHonolulu, OʻahuDecember 19, 1863
| January 20, 1891Palace Hotel, San Francisco, California, United Statesaged 54
|-
|width=auto| LiliʻuokalaniJanuary 29, 1891 – January 17, 1893
| 
| September 2, 1838Honolulu, Oʻahubiological daughter of Kapaʻakea and Keohokālole and hānai daughter of Pākī and Kōnia
| John Owen DominisʻAikupika, Haleakala Estate, Honolulu, OʻahuSeptember 16, 1862
| November 11, 1917Washington Place, Honolulu, Oʻahuaged 79
|-
|}

Styles

Timeline

See also 

House of Keoua
House of Kawānanakoa
List of governors of Hawaii

References

Bibliography

External links 
Hawaiian Head of State
Kingdom of Hawaii

Hawaii
Monarchs